The Grand Masters of the Knights Templar during the later 12th and the 13th century used a double-sided seal which showed a representation of The Dome of the Rock (or a circular dome of the Church of the Holy Sepulchre) on one side, and the Order's symbol of two knights on one horse on the other side. 
This design is first attested as in use by Bertrand de Blanquefort, the order's sixth Grand Master, in 1158, forty years after its foundation, and it remained in use until the dissolution of the order in 1312.

There was also a smaller, single-sided seal, which showed the Dome of the Rock (or the Holy Sepulchre), only.

Different seals were used by provincial masters of the order. According to a papal bull issued by Innocent IV in 1251, it was customary for successive provincial masters to use the same seal.
The master of Provence continued to use an Agnus Dei seal, while the seal of the Aragonese master William of Cardona and his successors depicted a knight on horseback, carrying a lance and shield, on which was a cross bearing the legend: S. MINISTRI TEMPLI 1 ARAGON 7 CATALON ("Seal of the minister of the Temple in Aragon and Catalonia").

Templars Seal Themes

Dome of the Rock and Al Aqsa Mosque 

The reverse of Bertrand de Blancafort's seal,
Master of the Temple 1168 in Staatsarchiv Amberg

The reverse of Grand Master William of Chartres seal from 1214 also depicts the Dome of the Rock.

Agnus Dei 
In heraldry, a Lamb of God (or paschal lamb, or agnus Dei) is a lamb passant proper, with a halo or charged with a cross gules, and the dexter forelimb reflexed over a cross staff from which a pennon of St. George (Argent a cross gules) is flotant.
The seals of the Masters of the Temple in England: of Aimery de St Maur, 1200, Robert of Sandford, 1241, Richard of Hastings, 1160–85, and William de la More, 1304, showed the agnus Dei.

SIGILLVM TEMPLI
The obverse of a seal used by William de la More, master, 1304, resembles the above text . The reverse, a small oval counter-seal, with beaded borders, shows on the right a couped bust of a bearded man wearing a cap. and have the legend:— TESTIS SUM AGNI ("I am a witness to the Lamb")
William de la More, styled frater Willelmus de la More miliciae. The seal is called commune sigillum capituli. The seal symbolic of their vow of poverty, showing two knights riding on one horse appears only to have been used by the order in France; there is no example of its use in England.

Some of the seals of the English Templars were a semi-typical Pascal lamb bearing sometimes, not the flag of St George (or the cross), but the Beauseant, the battle banner of the order.

Other seals:
Durham Cathedral Muniments, Medieval Seal G&B reference number: 3388
Knights of the Temple 1304 Description: Round. The Holy Lamb with banner.

The Two Riders

The symbol 

The Templar Seal showing two knights (perhaps Hugues de Payens and Godfrey de Saint-Omer) on one horse.
There are many interpretations of the symbolism of this seal.

 Contemporary legend held that the symbol represented the initial poverty of the order; that they could afford only a single horse for every two men. Still, the Rule of the Order from the outset permitted three horses and no more for each knight, as well as no Templars sharing the same horse.
 Several masters adopted this seal from the beginning of the order until at least 1298. It is known to have been in use since 1167. The Rule forbids two riders on the same beast.
 According to legend, Hugues de Payens (the first Grand-Master of the Templars) and Godfrey were so poor that between the two of them they had only one horse, and this gave rise to the famous image on the seal of the Templars, of two men riding a single horse.

The image of two knights on the horse was widely used:
 Matthew Paris in Chronica Majora ca 1250
 An English monk and chronicler from St. Albans in Historia Anglorum
 At least as early as 1158 as the seal of the Grand Master of the Temple, Bertrand de Blanchefort. This is the earliest known seal for the Grand Master of the Temple forty years after the Order was formed.
 Use of this symbol continued under subsequent Grand Masters for as long as the Order survived, however the seal went through more than one incarnation. The Reynaut de Vichiers, who was Master of the Temple from 1255-1259 depict same images, but it is obviously not the same seal.

The Legend 
The seals of the Grand Masters have textual differences:
 Blanchefort's seal: SIGILLUM MILITUM (Latin, Seal of the Soldiers) obverse; CHRISTI DE TEMPLO (Latin, of Christ of the Temple) reverse.
 Vichiers' seal: SIGILLUM MILITUM XPISTI (Latin, Seal of the Soldiers of Christ).
While Vichiers' motto is written in Latin, the word 'Christ' begins with Greek letters (Chi Rho) (Latin symbol, XP) rather than the Latin CHR. The XP symbol arose early in Christianity and entered popular usage after the legendary pre-battle vision of Chi Rho and Christian conversion of the 4th century Roman Emperor Constantine. From the time of Constantine, XP was a significant symbol of Christianity, surpassed only by the cross itself. Early military associations make Chi Rho an apt symbol for the Templars. On de Vichiers' seal, Chi Rho is visible on the shields of the knights.

The Eagle 

The Double-Headed Eagle is more commonly associated with Coat of Arms of the Byzantine Empire.
Bertram von Esbeck, Master of the Temple in Germany, 1296 depicts an eagle with two six-pointed stars.

Paris Temple

Cross
Aragon;Tortosa; Late 13th century. Depicting a cross. Legend: SIGILLUM MILICIE TEMPLI IN DERTOSA
Aragon; Alfambra; 1248. Brown wax, round, 30 mm. in diameter, depicting a cross. Legend:......LUM CASTRI....

Cross pattée 
A cross having arms narrow at the inner center, and very broad at the other end.

Cross pattée and fleur-de-lis 
A seal from Provence: the Templars from Roaix, Sérignan ... This knight, Giraud de Chamaret, hoists the templar cross and the "fleur-de-lis". 1234.

Knight on the Horse 
The seal of Brother Roustan de Comps, commander of the Order of the Temple at Richerenches, 1232, shows a single knight on horseback, bearing a shield with a cross: probably St. George.

Head 
Seals of Brother Widekind, Master of the Temple in Germany, 1271, and Brother Frederick Wildergrave, 1289, showed Christ's head (or John the Baptist's head by other opinions)

Tower or Castle 
The seal of Templar officials in Yorkshire c.1300 shows a tower with a pointed roof.

Aragon; Monzón; Early 14th century. Round, depicting a castle with three towers, with a griffin on each side. Legend: S. CASTELL........ONI.
Aragon; Huesca; Round, depicting a castle. Legend: S. DOM. TEMPLI DE OSCA
Aragon; Barbará; Early 14th century. Yellow wax, round, 29 mm. in diameter, depicting a castle between two fishes. Legend: S. COMMAND.....BARBERA

Chateau de Guilleragues 
Here is a Templar cross found in the oldest tower of Château de Guilleragues in the Aquitaine region of France.

Abraxas 

The word Abraxas (or Abrasax or Abracax) was engraved on certain antique stones, called Abraxas stones, which were used as amulets or charms by Gnostic sects.  The image most associated with Abraxas is that of a composite creature with the head of a rooster, the body of a man, and legs made of serpents or scorpions; carrying a whip and shield.  The Gnostics identified Abraxas with Yahweh (under the Greek form "IAO").  Amulets and seals bearing the figure of Abraxas were popular in the 2nd century, and these stones survived in the treasuries of the middle ages.

Abraxas appears on the seal of a Templar Grand Master in a French charter dated 1214.  The Templars' use of Abraxas as a seal was most likely a result of their expansive treasuries containing a number of ancient gemstones.

The Dove

Star and Crescent Moon

Lion 
Seals of Brother Otto of Brunswich, commander of Supplingenburg, shows a lion;
A seal of one Knight Templar, England, 1303 is showing the Lion of England and the cross pattée and the crescent moon of the Mother Goddess with stars.
Aragon; Miravet; 1278, 1287. Depicting a lion

Griffon 
William, Master of the Temple in Hungary and Slovenia, 1297, depicts a winged griffon

Unusual uncertified early Templar insignia

References 

 Hopkins, M, Simmans, G. & Wallace-Murphy, T., Rex Deus, Element, Shaftesbury, Dorset, 2000, 177
 F. de Sagarra, Sigillografía catalana, iii (Barcelona, 1932), 473
 R. de Huesca, Teatro histórico de las iglesias del reino de Aragón, vii (Pamplona, 1797), 121
 The Templars in the Corona de Aragón, Alan John Forey 

Seal
Gnosticism
Seals (insignia)
Seals of organizations